The Gymnastics Association of the Philippines (GAP) or simply Gymnastics Philippines is the governing body of gymnastics in the Philippines. The sporting body is a member of the Philippine Olympic Committee and recognized by the Philippine Sports Commission. It is also a member of the Fédération Internationale de Gymnastique and the Asian Gymnastics Union.

GAP was established in 1962 and became affiliated with the International Gymnastics Federation the following year.

References

National members of the Asian Gymnastics Union
Gymnastics
Sports organizations established in 1962
Gymnastics in the Philippines